The Punisher War Zone is a comic book series published by Marvel Comics about the vigilante The Punisher. The series was written and drawn by several artists during its run. The series lasted for 41 issues. It was the first series of The Punisher War Zone title history and lasted from 1992 to 1995. The vast majority of the series was written by Chuck Dixon. Besides John Romita Jr. who worked a lot on the series, several other artists painted the covers, among them Rainier "Rain" Beredo, John Buscema and Joe Kubert.

Plot
The series was split up in different story arcs which tended to last several issues. The first story arc was Psychoville U.S.A. which lasted from issue 12 to 16, the next was  The Jericho Syndrome beginning with issue 17 and ending in 19, third was Suicide Run from 23 to 25, after that was Conan with a Gun starting from 26 and lasting to issue 30, later was River of Blood picking up from issue 31 and concluding at 36, next to last was the Dark Judgment arc lasting from issue 38 to 40. The final arc was Countdown which took place in all three ongoing Punisher series at the time, The Punisher, War Journal and War Zone.

Reception
The series was popular upon its original release. The launching of the series, which was the Punisher third simultaneously ongoing series at the time, marked the peak of the character's exploitation and popularity at the time.

Content
In the beginning of the series publication Marvel still adhered to the comic code and even with the main character, Frank Castle, killing a criminal in the first issue no details or effects of the shooting is portrayed. This is in stark contrast to later Punisher series such as those by Garth Ennis. Despite this and other Punisher series remained controversial and rejected in some circuits. Upon the release of the hugely popular issue of Alpha Flight in which the character Northstar came out as gay the New York Magazine reported that a store in Bleecker Street in New York City resorted to making customers who wanted to buy a copy of it purchase an issue of the series The Punisher War Zone as well to combat hoarding of the comic.

Prints

Issues

Annuals

Collected editions

See also
 1992 in comics

References

External links
 The Punisher War Zone at the Comic Book DB

1992 comics debuts
Comics set in New York City
Punisher titles